Cervione is a commune of the Haute-Corse department of France on the island of Corsica. It is home to the Saint Erasmus cathedral, which was completed in 1745, and is an example of the baroque style.

Geography
The town of Cervione is located to the east of Corsica island. It is the main ancient core of population between Bastia and Aleria which are the two most populated closer city. It dominate the oriental plain at the place where it is narrowest.

Cervione's hinterland is the Castaniccia a wet region with a lot of ancient villages and hamlets in the slot of Monte San Petrone (1767) the highest top of the shist part of Corsica (the quart of the north east of the island).

Population

See also
Communes of the Haute-Corse department

References

External links
Cervione's official website
Photo of the cathedral in Cervione

Communes of Haute-Corse
Haute-Corse communes articles needing translation from French Wikipedia